Joseph Somers may refer to:
 Joseph Somers (artist)
 Joseph Somers (cyclist)

See also
 SoMo (Joseph Anthony Somers-Morales), American singer and songwriter